Jonathan Raggett (born 3 November 1992) is a Chinese–English actor. His career includes notable roles in productions such as Wolfblood and The Lady.

Career
He began his professional acting career in 2011, playing the youngest son of Aung San Suu Kyi in The Lady and guest-starring in the television series Dani's House. He and Amanda Donohoe were both cast in the 2013 film Trafficker.

Raggett then starred in a commercial for Nintendo DS. He gained further fame for his role as Jimi in the series Wolfblood.
 
In 2017 he featured in the horror film Strangers Within.

Filmography

References

External links
 

1992 births
21st-century English male actors
British male actors of Chinese descent
English male film actors
Living people
People educated at East Sussex College
People from Brighton